Taymyrsky Dolgano-Nenetsky District is an administrative and municipal district (raion), one of the forty-three in Krasnoyarsk Krai, Russia. It is located in the north of the krai above the Arctic Circle on the Taymyr Peninsula and borders with Laptev and Kara Seas in the north, the Sakha Republic in the east, Evenkiysky and Turukhansky Districts in the south, and with Yamalo-Nenets Autonomous Okrug in the west. Its administrative center is the town of Dudinka, which accounts for 64.4% of the district's total population.

Norilsk is an enclave surrounded by, but independent from, Taymyrsky Dolgano-Nenetsky District. In 2005, the central city of Norilsk merged with its satellite cities or neighborhoods (Talnakh and Kayerkan) as a municipal division. Greater Norilsk, or Big Norilsk, is the Norilsk Industrial Region and is the Krai city. Greater Norilsk includes Norilsk, the remote area of Oganer, and the urban-type settlement of Snezhnogorsk and is equal to a district within the Krasnoyarsk Krai and is not part of the Taymyrsky Dolgano-Nenetsky District.

History
The district was founded on April 10, 1930. Until January 1, 2007, it existed as Taymyr Autonomous Okrug, a federal subject of Russia.

Government
The Head of the district is Vershinin Evgeny Vladimirovich.

Demographics

Vital statistics
Source: Russian Federal State Statistics Service

Ethnic groups
Of the 39,786 residents (as of the 2002 census) 1,018 (2.6%) chose not to specify their ethnic background. A quarter of the population identified themselves as indigenous Siberians (Dolgans, Nenets, Nganasans, Evenks, or Enets). 58.6% of the population were ethnic Russians. Other nationalities included 2,423 Ukrainians (6.1%), 587 Volga Germans (1.5%), 425 Volga Tatars (1.1%), 294 Belarusians (0.7%) and 239 Azeris (0.6%)

See also 
 Taymyr Nature Reserve

References

Notes

Sources

Districts of Krasnoyarsk Krai
States and territories established in 1930
Russian-speaking countries and territories